Son of the Bride is a 1973 BBC television comedy which lasted one series.

The central character was Neville Leggit, played by Terry Scott, a mother's boy who was rather old to be still single.  He was secretly engaged to his girlfriend, but dragging his feet about actually getting married.

His mother, played by Mollie Sugden, was a widow who was intending to remarry (to a man played by George A. Cooper).  Her son was not happy about the marriage (at one point we see him reading a book "Matrimonial Law", evidently trying to find a way of stopping it).

In real life, Scott was actually in his mid-40s, and Sugden was only five years older than he was.

None of the episodes still exist in the BBC archives and are believed to have been destroyed.

External links
 
 

BBC television sitcoms
Lost BBC episodes
1970s British comedy television series
1973 British television series debuts
1973 British television series endings